The 1985 Grote Prijs Jef Scherens was the 21st edition of the Grote Prijs Jef Scherens cycle race and was held on 15 September 1985. The race started and finished in Leuven. The race was won by Jozef Lieckens.

General classification

References

1985
1985 in road cycling
1985 in Belgian sport